Tucker v. Masser, 113 U.S. 203 (1885),  was an action of ejectment for the possession of three lots in what is known as Stevens' and Leiter's subdivision of the City of Leadville, in Lake county, Colorado. Smelting Co. v. Kemp, was carefully considered, and was again affirmed.

See also
List of United States Supreme Court cases, volume 113

References

External links
 

United States Supreme Court cases
United States Supreme Court cases of the Waite Court
1885 in United States case law
Lake County, Colorado